The Battle of Summit Springs, on July 11, 1869, was an armed conflict between elements of the United States Army under the command of Colonel Eugene A. Carr and a group of Cheyenne Dog Soldiers led by Tall Bull, who was killed during the engagement. The US forces were assigned to retaliate for a series of raids in north-central Kansas by Chief Tall Bull's Dog Soldiers band of the Cheyenne. The battle happened south of Sterling, Colorado in Washington County near the Logan/Washington county line.

Battle
After Pawnee Scouts under Major Frank North led his command to Tall Bull's village, Colonel Carr, a veteran campaigner known as "The Black-Bearded Cossack", deployed his forces carefully so that they hit the unsuspecting camp from three sides at once. He had 244 men of the 5th United States Regiment of Cavalry and 50 Pawnee Scouts.

Captain Luther North of the Pawnee Scout Battalion related this incident in the book Man of the Plains: 
About a half mile from and off to one side from our line, a Cheyenne boy was herding horses. He was about fifteen years old and we were very close to him before he saw us. He jumped on his horse and gathered up his herd and drove them into the village ahead of our men, who were shooting at him. He was mounted on a very good horse and could easily have gotten away if he had left his herd, but he took them all in ahead of him, then at the edge of the village he turned and joined a band of warriors that were trying to hold us back, while the women and children were getting away, and there he died like a warrior. No braver man ever existed than that 15 year old boy.

Major Frank North saw an Indian rise from cover and take aim at him. He shot and killed the man, who turned out to be Chief Tall Bull. Meanwhile, the Pawnee surrounded 20 Cheyenne warriors who were sheltering in a ravine. Armed only with bows and arrows, the Cheyenne kept their attackers at bay until their arrows ran out, whereupon the Pawnees moved in and killed them all.

According to the anthropologist George Bird Grinnell (who worked with George Bent in the 20th century on these accounts), in addition to Tall Bull and the twenty men in the ravine, nine other people were killed by members of the Pawnee Scout Battalion: two warriors (Lone Bear and Pile of Bones); a very old Suhtai woman on a slow pony; two Sioux women running on foot; a Cheyenne woman and two children (a boy and a girl); and an old Sioux woman whose horse fell and threw her. Grinnell noted only four victims who were not attributed to the Pawnee Scout Battalion: the wife, mother-in-law and two young children of a man named Red Cherries. Grinnell and Donald J. Berthrong identified 23 warriors, one fifteen-year-old boy, five women and two children killed by members of the Pawnee Scout Battalion, and two women and two children whose killers are not specified. This gives a total of 35 people killed. It appears that, although the 5th Cavalrymen had the greater number of participants, the Pawnees were more successful in the killing.

One Cheyenne escaped on Tall Bull's distinctive white horse. He was shot off it by Scout William Cody (Buffalo Bill) in a skirmish the next day, leading Cody to believe that he had killed Tall Bull. In his biography of Luther North, Grinnell footnoted this event, saying:
William Cody later claimed he had killed Tall Bull and Cody's protagonists  have stated that Luther North's account of the shooting was an invention. However, while Frank was a partner with Cody in the cattle business, he related the story of the shooting in detail essentially as Luther recollected it.
 
Carr reported only a single casualty in his command (a trooper wounded) and claimed that 52 Indians had been killed. Seventeen women and children were captured, along with more than 300 horses and mules. One white woman captive, Susanna Alderdice, was killed and another, Maria Weichell, was wounded.

See also
 List of battles fought in Colorado

References

Sources

External links
 
 Summit Springs Battlefield

Summit Springs
1869 in the United States
Summit Springs
Summit Springs
Summit Springs
Summit Springs
Pre-statehood history of Colorado
Summit Springs
Summit Springs
1869 in Colorado Territory
July 1869 events